Pteroteinon laterculus, the brown-winged red-eye, is a butterfly in the family Hesperiidae. It is found in Ivory Coast, Ghana, Nigeria, Cameroon, Gabon, the Republic of the Congo, the western part of the Democratic Republic of the Congo and possibly Sierra Leone. The habitat consists of dense forests.

References

Butterflies described in 1890
Erionotini
Butterflies of Africa